Paul Manuel (born 30 December 1967, in Delft) is a sailor from the Netherlands, who represented his country at the 1992 Summer Olympics in Barcelona. Manuel, as crew, in the Dutch Tornado, with Ron van Teylingen as helmsman, took the 6th place.

TamTam 

Paul studied commercial engineering at the Haagse Hogeschool. In 1995 he and his brother Bart Manuel founded TamTam, a full-service digital agency that aims to “Create awesome digital experiences that make people smile”.

TamTam grew steadily along with the digital market up until 2007, when it reformulated its ambitions and set out to become one of the top 3 digital agencies in The Netherlands. It did so in 2012 and then aimed to expand its activities internationally.

In the following years TamTam acquired several international clients. In 2015 it entered a new phase in this process by closing a deal with Waterland, a private equity firm that was looking for a digital agency to invest in. TamTam became the launching platform for a buy-and-build-strategy. The deal opened up many possibilities and soon deals were made with other companies that added their specialism to the digital mix.

Dept 

The conjunction of all these different agencies called for a new company name. In 2016 Paul and Bart co-founded Dept, an international network of leading digital agencies that is growing in a high pace.

Dept aims to bring together expert agencies that help build brands, campaigns, experiences, digital products and the services of the future. To maintain their identity the individual agencies operate under their own name, with the addition ‘A part of Dept’, indicating they are components of a larger, international whole.

At the moment Dept has offices in both Europe and the US, combining over 1750 professionals to offer a full digital service.

Further reading

1992 Olympics (Barcelona)

References

Living people
1967 births
Sportspeople from Delft
Dutch male sailors (sport)
Sailors at the 1992 Summer Olympics – Tornado
Olympic sailors of the Netherlands